Matthew Joseph Shaffer (born May 4, 1978) is an American musical theatre, television, and film actor, director, executive producer, author,
and choreographer. He was born in Florence, Colorado, USA.

Career
Shaffer began his career in Southern California. He attended Orange County High School of the Arts. He was accepted as a performing apprentice to the concert dance company Giordano Dance Chicago in 1996. He became a principal in the company the following year.
After three years touring the United States and Europe he left the company. 
He worked in the ensemble of the Radio City Christmas Spectacular at Radio City Music Hall in New York City for five seasons. Shaffer was involved in the final stunt of the feature film Jackass Number Two, with Johnny Knoxville. Shaffer had comedic roles in two off-beat and independent short films: Feet Afire in 2005, and in 2006 the movie Queerspiracy, which was an official selection at the 2007 Breckenridge Film Festival. In November 2006, he originated the role of Bergdwarf Goodman, the narrative gnome in the Los Angeles Opera production of Hansel and Gretel at the Dorothy Chandler Pavilion. In October 2007, he completed his first 35 mm film project as choreographer on the set of Harrison Bergeron, based on the Kurt Vonnegut short story. In November 2007, Shaffer originated the lead role "Sim" in the revival of Ray Bradbury's Frost and Fire directed by Zina Bethune, at the Alex Theatre, in Los Angeles, CA.  From 2010 through 2015 Shaffer and his producing partner, Jeff Payton created 40 pop culture digital shorts, which garnered a large fan base and led them to create and option two television pilots.  In 2015 Shaffer's first book, "So You Want To Be A Dancer", was published by Rowman & Littlefield Publishing Group.  In 2016 he was commissioned by Slippery Rock University of Pennsylvania to choreograph his first concert dance piece entitled, "Give Me A Mingus" set to the music of Charles Mingus.

Roles

Theatre
 Hansel and Gretel...reprised his role of “Gnome”…Dorothy Chandler Pavilion…Los Angeles, CA 2018
 Maggie Miguel ...a corporate American employee  ...Directed and Choreographed... One Woman Show starring Maggie Miguel ...ACME Comedy Theatre Los Angeles, CA March 2009
 Share Inc. Boomtown Benefit...Ensemble...Santa Monica Civic Auditorium...Santa Monica, California 2008
 Frost and Fire…originated lead role “Sim”…Alex Theatre Los Angeles, CA 2007
 Hansel and Gretel…originated the role “Gnome”…Dorothy Chandler Pavilion…Los Angeles, CA 2006
 Stand Up Salad…Comic…Friars Club of Beverly Hills 2006
 Radio City Christmas Spectacular…Ensemble….Radio City Music Hall…2000–2005 (Five Seasons)
 Tess’ Last Night…The Stalker…Greenwich House Theatre…NYC…2003
 16th Annual BC/EFA Easter Bonnet Competition…Ensemble…New Amsterdam Theatre…2002
 On A Clear Day You Can See Forever (Workshop)…Ensemble…New York City Center…2001
 Synthesis Dance Project…Ensemble…NYC…2000
 TheMantis Project...Trio of Three performer...Symphony Space, NYC...2000
 Pat and Debby Boone Show… Ensemble…Branson, MO…1999
 Andy Williams Show…Ensemble…Branson, MO…1998
 Giordano Dance Chicago…Principal Dancer…Chicago, IL…1997–1999 (Three Seasons)
 Chicago Symphony Orchestra…Ensemble Dancer…Chicago, IL…1997
 Hercules Spectacular…Ensemble…Chicago Theatre…1997

Film/Television
The Affair (TV series) Showtime...Choreographer...2017 
Crazy Ex-Girlfriend The CW...Actor...2016 
Broad City Comedy Central...Actor...2016 
 Wet Hot American Summer: First Day of Camp  Netflix...Actor...2015
 Kickin It  Disney XD...Actor...2011
 Billy Glimmer (Ben Stiller Project)...Choreographer...2010
 The Real Housewives Parody Movie  Executive producer / Writer / Director / Actor...2010
 Children's Hospital  Choreographer....2010
 Harrison Bergeron 35 mm film…Choreographer…2007
 Twinkle Time (Television pilot)…Choreographer / Actor…2007
 Michael Poppins (Television pilot)...Tambourine Man...2007
 Queerspiracy…Justin Davies…2006
 Cold Case…Kit Kat Boy…2006
 Jackass Number Two…Dancer…2006
 Earth To America…Performer…2005
 Feet Afire…Chad La Rosa…2005
 Mona Lisa Smile…Dancer…2002
 All My Children''...Featured...2001

Writings
Shaffer authored his first book, So You Want To Be A Dancer, March 9, 2015. On March 29, 2015 he launched So You Want To Be A Dancer at Broadway Dance Center and continued on a nationwide tour, teaching and promoting his book which was a Number 1 New Release in the Performing Arts category on Amazon.com. Matthew is also one of fifty contributing authors of the book, The I'Mpossible Project: Reengaging With Life, Creating a New You, an inspirational book which highlights topics including, empowerment, suicide prevention, and LGBT themes; released by Skookum Hill Publishing on January 13, 2016. On September 10, 2019 Shaffer releases his sophomore book Dancing Out of the Closet, a collection of comedically true stories about his life as an performer living "in" and eventually "out" of the closet.

Published works

References

External links
 
 

American male musical theatre actors
American male film actors
1978 births
Living people
People from Fremont County, Colorado
People from Orange County, California
Male actors from California
Orange County School of the Arts alumni